Marco Angelini (born 26 July 1984 in Voitsberg, Steiermark) is an Austrian singer and songwriter, who withdrew from public life in 2014 and started working as a doctor since .

Family
Marco Angelini was born in Voitsburg, Steiermark State in Austria, from an Austrian mother, Luxembourgish father and Italian grandparents. Currently living in Graz, he has been in a relationship with professional dancer Maria Santner. since 2014.

Education and career

Education
After his A-Levels Marco Angelini studied medicine at the Medical University in Graz. He spent a semester abroad in Luxembourg and did a practical year at Klinikum Passau in Germany. In 2012 he graduated as Doctor of Medicine.

Sports
Marco Angelini had played handball as a left wing at the HSG REMUS Baernbach/Koeflach for more than twelve years, however, he had to give up his handball career after two serious injuries (including cruciate ligament).

Music
Marco Angelini had participated in various talent shows, like Helden von morgen, Starmania and X Factor. By participating in season 8 of Deutschland sucht den Superstar – the German equivalent of American Idol – he reached the 4th place.

He later performed in Germany, Greece, Austria, Luxembourg and Spain, both as a solo artist and with his student band, "Black Balloon", that was founded 2008. Angelini also worked as a juror.

His musical scope ranges from pop, rock and Austropop. His musical influences can be found by its own account with the Red Hot Chili Peppers, Kings of Leon, Paolo Nutini and James Morrison.

In 2011 Angelini signed a recording contract with Sony Music – Austria, where his first single "Leuchtturm", which was produced by Alexander Kahr, was recorded and released in December 2011.

After moving to 2DayRecords the Maxi – CD called "Du & Ich" was published on 25 January 2013.
"Du & Ich" entered on the Austrian Charts at No. 69.

His second single – produced again in cooperation with 2DayRecords – called "Mein Engel (hier auf Erden)" has reached number 84 in the charts. It was published on 31 May 2013.

On 4 October 2013, his third single called "Wunder gibt es immer wieder" was released and reached number 62 in the German charts.

After his participation in "Ich bin ein Star – Holt mich hier raus!" he published a party song called "Heute Nacht", which reached No. 54 in the German charts, and 51 in the Austrian charts.

Marco Angelini announced a musical break in 2014.

He published a song called "Goodbye" in cooperation with Leo Aberer. They also produced a Christmas song that joined the Austrian charts at number 23 in the first week and peaked at number 9.

Projects on television
In January 2014 Angelini participated in the German reality-Show "Ich bin ein Star – Holt mich hier raus!" produced and shown by RTL.  He left the show with the sixth place.

In the same year, he danced with Maria Santner in the 9th season of the dance show "Dancing Stars" produced by ORF eins and reached second place.

Temporary break
In the end of July 2014, Angelini announced his temporary end of his career as a singer and performed his last live show in 13 September 2014, wanting to continue his work as a doctor and focus on his private life, while still intending to work as a singer again in the future.

Discography

Albums
 2013: Best Of

Singles and releases
 2011: Leuchtturm
 2013: Du & ich
 2013: Mein Engel (hier auf Erden)
 2013: Wunder gibt es immer wieder
 2014: Heute Nacht
 2014: Suzie
 2014: Goodbye – Marco Angelini & Leo Aberer

Awards
 Cool Music Award 2011 (music magazine Cool)
 Cool Music Award 2012 (music magazine Cool)
 Badge of honour in silver of his hometown Voitsberg 2011
 Sexiest Austrian Celebrity alive 2011
 Best Singer 2011 (youth magazine Xpress)
 Best Newcomer 2011 (youth magazine Xpress)
 Best Austrian Star 2011 (youth magazine Xpress)
 Best Austrian Star 2012 (youth magazine Xpress)

Social projects
Marco Angelini is deeply committed to people with special needs and has supported the athletes of Special Olympics Austria voluntarily for many years, first as a coach for field hockey and handball, and since 2011, as assistant to the team doctor. At the Special Olympics Summer Games 2015, Marco took part as the new team doctor.

He also actively contributes to the development of children and youth sports programs.

Literature
 Claudia Fuerbach: Marco Angelini: Das große Fanbuch. Roed Verlag, published 30 November 2013.
 Claudia Fuerbach: Marco Angelini: Live on Stage!. Roed Verlag, published 20 December 2014.

References

Living people
1984 births
Austrian pop singers
Participants in German reality television series
21st-century Austrian singers
Ich bin ein Star – Holt mich hier raus! participants